Garcilaso de la Vega (or Garci Lasso de la Vega) may refer to:

Garci Lasso de la Vega I (d. 1326), Castilian noble
Garci Lasso de la Vega II (d. 1351), Castilian noble, son of Garci Lasso de la Vega I
Garcilaso de la Vega (poet) (c. 1501–1536), Spanish poet and soldier
 Sebastián Garcilaso de la Vega y Vargas (1507–1559), Spanish conquistador, father of Inca Garcilaso de la Vega
Inca Garcilaso de la Vega (1539–1616), Peruvian chronicler

See also
Estadio Garcilaso, primary football stadium of Cuzco, Peru, named for Garcilaso de la Vega (chronicler)